14 kDa phosphohistidine phosphatase is an enzyme that in humans is encoded by the PHPT1 gene.

References

Further reading